This is a list of diplomatic missions of Spain, excluding honorary consulates. The Kingdom of Spain has a large global diplomatic presence.

Africa

 Algiers (Embassy)
 Oran (Consulate-General)

 Luanda (Embassy)

 Yaoundé (Embassy)

 Praia (Embassy)

 Kinshasa (Embassy)

 Cairo (Embassy)

 Malabo (Embassy)
 Bata (Consulate-General)

 Addis Ababa (Embassy)

 Libreville (Embassy)

 Banjul (Embassy office)

 Accra (Embassy)

 Conakry (Embassy)

 Bissau (Embassy)

 Abidjan (Embassy)

 Nairobi (Embassy)

 Tripoli (Embassy)

 Bamako (Embassy)

 Nouakchott (Embassy)
 Nouadhibou (Consulate-General)

 Rabat (Embassy)
 Agadir (Consulate-General)
 Casablanca (Consulate-General)
 Nador (Consulate-General)
 Tanger (Consulate-General)
 Tetuan (Consulate-General)
 Larache (Consulate)

 Maputo (Embassy)

 Windhoek (Embassy)

 Niamey (Embassy)

 Abuja (Embassy)
 Lagos (Consulate-General)

 Dakar (Embassy)

 Pretoria (Embassy)
 Cape Town (Embassy/Consulate-General)

 Khartoum (Embassy)

 Dar es Salaam (Embassy)

 Tunis (Embassy)

 Harare (Embassy)

Americas

 Buenos Aires (Embassy)
 Bahía Blanca (Consulate-General)
 Córdoba (Consulate-General)
 Mendoza (Consulate-General)
 Rosario (Consulate-General)

 La Paz (Embassy)
 Santa Cruz de la Sierra (Consulate-General)

 Brasília (Embassy)
 Porto Alegre (Consulate-General)
 Rio de Janeiro (Consulate-General)
 Salvador (Consulate-General)
 São Paulo (Consulate-General)

 Ottawa (Embassy)
 Montreal (Consulate-General)
 Toronto (Consulate-General)

 Santiago (Embassy)

 Bogotá (Embassy)

 San José (Embassy)

 Havana (Embassy)

 Santo Domingo (Embassy)

 Quito (Embassy)
 Guayaquil (Consulate-General)

 San Salvador (Embassy)

 Guatemala City (Embassy)

 Port-au-Prince (Embassy)

 Tegucigalpa (Embassy)

 Kingston (Embassy)

 Mexico City (Embassy)
 Guadalajara (Consulate-General)
 Monterrey (Consulate-General)

 Managua (Embassy)

 Panama City (Embassy)

 Asunción (Embassy)

 Lima (Embassy)

 Port of Spain (Embassy)

 Washington, D.C. (Embassy)
 Boston (Consulate-General)
 Chicago (Consulate-General)
 Houston (Consulate-General)
 Los Angeles (Consulate-General)
 Miami (Consulate-General)
 New York City (Consulate-General)
 San Francisco (Consulate-General)
 San Juan (Consulate-General)

 Montevideo (Embassy)

 Caracas (Embassy)

Asia

 Baku (Embassy office)

 Dhaka (Embassy)

 Beijing (Embassy)
 Chengdu (Consulate-General)
 Guangzhou (Consulate-General)
 Hong Kong (Consulate-General)
 Shanghai (Consulate-General)

 Tbilisi (Embassy office)

 New Delhi (Embassy)
 Mumbai (Consulate-General)

 Jakarta (Embassy)

 Tehran (Embassy)

 Baghdad (Embassy)

 Tel Aviv (Embassy)

 Tokyo (Embassy)

 Amman (Embassy)

 Astana (Embassy)

 Kuwait City (Embassy)

 Beirut (Embassy)

 Kuala Lumpur (Embassy)
 
 Yangon (Embassy) 

 Muscat (Embassy)

 Islamabad (Embassy)
 
 Jerusalem (Consulate-General)

 Manila (Embassy)

 Doha (Embassy)

 Riyadh (Embassy)

 Singapore (Embassy)

 Seoul (Embassy)

Taipei (Spanish Chamber of Commerce)

 Bangkok (Embassy)

 Ankara (Embassy)
 Istanbul (Consulate-General)

 Abu Dhabi (Embassy)

 Hanoi (Embassy)

Europe 

 Tirana (Embassy)

 Andorra la Vella (Embassy)

 Vienna (Embassy)

 Brussels (Embassy)

 Sarajevo (Embassy)

 Sofia (Embassy)

 Zagreb (Embassy)

 Nicosia (Embassy)

 Prague (Embassy)

 Copenhagen (Embassy)

 Tallinn (Embassy)

 Helsinki (Embassy)

 Paris (Embassy)
 Bayonne (Consulate-General)
 Bordeaux (Consulate-General)
 Lyon (Consulate-General)
 Montpellier (Consulate-General)
 Marseille (Consulate-General)
 Pau (Consulate-General)
 Perpignan (Consulate-General)
 Strasbourg (Consulate-General)
 Toulouse (Consulate-General)

 Berlin (Embassy)
 Düsseldorf (Consulate-General)
 Frankfurt (Consulate-General)
 Hamburg (Consulate-General)
 Munich (Consulate-General)
 Stuttgart (Consulate-General)

 Athens (Embassy)

 Rome (Embassy)

 Budapest (Embassy)

 Dublin (Embassy)

 Rome (Embassy)
 Milan (Consulate-General)
 Naples (Consulate-General)

 Riga (Embassy)

 Vilnius (Embassy)

 Luxembourg City (Embassy)

 Valletta (Embassy)

 The Hague (Embassy)
 Amsterdam (Consulate-General)

 Skopje (Embassy)

 Oslo (Embassy)

 Warsaw (Embassy)

 Lisbon (Embassy)
 Porto (Consulate-General)

 Bucharest (Embassy)

 Moscow (Embassy)
 Saint Petersburg (Consulate-General)

 Belgrade (Embassy)

 Bratislava (Embassy)

 Ljubljana (Embassy)

 Stockholm (Embassy)

 Bern (Embassy)
 Geneva (Consulate-General)
 Zürich (Consulate-General)

 Kyiv (Embassy)

 London (Embassy)
 Edinburgh (Consulate-General)
 Manchester (Consulate-General)

Oceania

 Canberra (Embassy)
 Melbourne (Consulate-General)
 Sydney (Consulate-General)

 Suva (Embassy office)

 Wellington (Embassy)

Multilateral Organizations
 Addis Ababa (Permanent Observer to the African Union)
 Brussels (Permanent Missions to the European Union and NATO)
 Geneva (Permanent Missions to the United Nations and other international organizations)
 Nairobi (Permanent Missions to the United Nations and other international organizations)
 New York (Permanent Mission to the United Nations)
 Paris (Mission to OECD and UNESCO)
 Rome (Permanent Mission to FAO)
 Strasbourg (Permanent Mission to the Council of Europe)
 Vienna (Permanent Mission to the United Nations)
 Washington, D.C. (Permanent Observer to the Organization of American States)

Gallery

Closed missions

Africa

Americas

Asia

Europe

Future missions to open
Below is a list of countries where the government of Spain has stated its intentions to open a diplomatic mission:

 Yerevan (Embassy)

Notes

See also
 Foreign Relations of Spain
 List of diplomatic missions in Spain

References

External links

 Ministry of Foreign Affairs of Spain

 
Diplomatic missions
Spain